The 1946-47 Segunda Divisão is the 13rd season of Segunda Divisão ~ Portuguese Second Division season

Table

Group 1

Group 2

Group 3

Group 4

Group 5

Group 6

Group 7

Group 8

Group 9

Group 10

Group 11

Group 12

Group 13

Group 14

Group 15

Group 16

Playoff Phases

Second phase

Group A

Group B

Group C

Group D

Final

 (NO) – Norte 

 (CE) – Centro 

 (LI) – Lisboa 

 (ALE) – Alentejo 

<small> (AL) – Algarve

Final phase

References

Portuguese Second Division seasons
Portugal
2